Kingdom of Tibet might refer to:
 Tibetan Empire
 Tibet (1912–1951)